Jada Newton is a soccer player who plays as a forward for college team Gardner–Webb Runnin' Bulldogs and the United States Virgin Islands women's national team.

High school and college career 
Newton played high school soccer at Osbourn Park High School in Virginia, where she helped her team defeat Woodbridge High School for the first time in over 20 years.

As a freshman in 2018 at Gardner-Webb, Newton played all 21 games in the season, as she scored 10 goals.  She was also named to the Big South second team all-conference and the all-freshman team.

In 2019, Newton made 19 appearances, scoring 7 goals.

In the 2020 season (played in the spring of 2021), Newton scored 4 goals in 8 games, and was named Big South Offensive Player of the Week on March 9.

International career 
Newton earned her first senior team call up in October 2019 for the 2020 CONCACAF Women's Olympic Qualifying Championship qualification tournament.

She appeared in all 4 games in the tournament for the U.S. Virgin Islands.

References 

1999 births
United States Virgin Islands women's international soccer players
Living people
Gardner–Webb Runnin' Bulldogs women's soccer players
Soccer players from Virginia
People from Prince William County, Virginia
United States Virgin Islands women's soccer players
Women's association football forwards